Trochu can refer to:

 Trochu, Alberta
 Louis Jules Trochu, French military leader and politician